Chelyshevsky is a rural locality (a khutor) in Galushkinskoye Rural Settlement, Novoanninsky District, Volgograd Oblast, Russia. The population was 129 as of 2010. There are 2 streets.

Geography 
Chelyshevsky is located 40 km northeast of Novoanninsky (the district's administrative centre) by road. Kirpichevsky is the nearest rural locality.

References 

Rural localities in Novoanninsky District